Patrick Palmer (born November 6, 1962 in Vancouver, British Columbia, Canada) is a former Canadian national rugby player.

Palmer played a total of 17 games for Canada, including 3 matches in the 1987 Rugby World Cup, where he scored the first try against Tonga, as well as 3 matches in the 1991 Rugby World Cup.

He also coached the 1994 UBC Old Boys Ravens squad which won its fifth provincial title against Cowichan with some supporters even taking a helicopter to the game on Vancouver Island and briefly hovering overhead to catch a bird’s-eye view. In 2001, Palmer coached Canada Under-17 and Canada Sevens. Currently, he coaches the St. George's School sevens team.

References

External links
Pat Palmer international stats

1962 births
Living people
Canadian rugby union players
Canadian rugby union coaches
Sportspeople from Vancouver
Canada international rugby union players
University of British Columbia alumni